La Force Prison was a French prison located in the Rue du Roi de Sicile, in what is now the 4th arrondissement of Paris. Originally known as the Hôtel de la Force, the buildings formed the private residence of Henri-Jacques Nompar de Caumont, duc de la Force. Towards the end of the reign of Louis XIV, the Hôtel de la Force was divided into two parts, one of which took the name of the Hôtel de Brienne, and had its entrance in the Rue Pavée; the other retained its former name and had its entrance in the Rue du Roi de Sicile.

La Grande Force
After passing through several hands, the buildings were acquired, in 1754, by the war ministry, and were transformed, in 1780, into a prison.

The Hôtel de la Force was renamed La Grande Force and was intended for debtors and those charged with civil offences. The prison consisted of several buildings, each of which had a separate yard. The most airy building was situated in the centre between two yards planted with trees. It was there that such prisoners were detained who could incur some expense. On the left was the infirmary.

La Petite Force
At the same time as the Hôtel de la Force was being converted into a prison, the Hôtel de Brienne was demolished, and a new prison for prostitutes was erected on its site, which was called La Petite Force. The front presented a somber aspect. It was ornamented with vermiculated rustics and the entrance was formed by an elliptical arch. It was three stories high and was surmounted by a Doric cornice. In its construction, neither wood nor plaster were employed, the whole being built of stone bound together by iron bars. It was located adjacent to the Hôtel de Lamoignon.

During the French Revolution, this prison was used for political prisoners, and it was here that the close friend of Marie Antoinette, the Princesse de Lamballe was taken. La Force came under attack by violent mobs on 3 September 1792, and the four following days: one hundred and sixty prisoners, among whom were three priests and the Princesse de Lamballe, were massacred there.

The Grande Force had housed only male prisoners and the Petite Force had been used exclusively for women, however, in 1830 the two prisons were united, and placed under one management. The whole prison was then converted to house males committed for trial. These prisoners were divided into two separate groups: the old offenders into one ward, the young and comparatively innocent into another.

The prisoners slept in large and well ventilated chambers, and the boys each had a small apartment which contained a single bed. The prisoners had the privilege of working if they wished, but they were not obliged to do so, inasmuch as they were on remand and not yet convicted of crime. There was a department for the sick, a bathing-room, a parlor, and an advocate's room, where the prisoners could hold conversations with their legal defenders.

The two prisons of La Force were demolished in 1845, and the only remaining part is a section of wall adjoining the City of Paris Historical Library.

Notable prisoners

Detainees included:
 Benjamin Nicolas Marie Appert
 Jean Sylvain Bailly
 Pierre-Jean de Béranger
 Aimé Picquet du Boisguy
 Edme Castaing
 George Henry Caunter
 Constantin-François Chassebœuf
 Clotworthy Skeffington, 2nd Earl of Massereene, Irish nobleman
 Claude Fournier
 Évariste Galois
 Pierre Choderlos de Laclos
 Victor Claude Alexandre Fanneau de Lahorie 
 Claude Ledoux
 Simon-Nicolas-Henri Linguet
 Gregor MacGregor
 Marie Angélique de Mackau
 Francisco de Miranda
 Anne de Noailles
 Princess Marie Louise of Savoy
 Pierre Victurnien Vergniaud and 12 other Girondist deputies

Fictional detainees included:
 Charles Darnay (fictional character in Charles Dickens' A Tale of Two Cities)
 Lucien de Rubempré (fictional character in Honoré de Balzac's Illusions perdues)
 Thénardier (fictional character in Victor Hugo's Les Misérables)
 Benedetto (fictional character in Alexander Dumas' The Count of Monte-Cristo)
 James Dillon (fictional character in John Hobart Caunter's The Fellow Commoner (1836))

Footnotes

Attribution

Sources

External links

 Hôtel de La Force La Force Prisons, Gallery

1780 establishments in France
Defunct prisons in Paris
Buildings and structures in the 4th arrondissement of Paris
Buildings and structures demolished in 1845